Phlogochroa rubida is a moth of the family Noctuidae first described by William Jacob Holland in 1920. It is found in the Democratic Republic of the Congo.

References

Moths described in 1920
Calpinae